Abida bigerrensis is a species of air-breathing land snail, a terrestrial pulmonate gastropod mollusc in the family  Chondrinidae.

Geographic distribution
Abida bigerrensis is restricted to the central and western Pyrenees in France, and the eastern Cantabrian Mountains in Spain.

Ecology 
Abida bigerrensis lives within crevices or under stones in karstic areas. In humid environments it may also be found on the rock surface.

References

Chondrinidae
Gastropods of Europe
Gastropods described in 1856